Mark Allen Callahan (born May 11, 1977) is an American information technology consultant and perennial candidate. He was the Republican nominee in the 2016 United States Senate election in Oregon.

Political career 
Callahan is known as a perennial candidate, having frequently sought office since 2009 in both Oregon and most recently in Texas.

Callahan sought appointment to a seat in the Oregon Senate in 2009 as a Democrat.

In 2010, he ran for the Lane County Commission. Later in 2010, Callahan ran for the Oregon House of Representatives, unsuccessfully seeking the nomination of the Independent Party of Oregon before receiving the nomination of the Pacific Green Party, in what he later said was an attempt to take away votes from the Democratic incumbent, Nancy Nathanson, in order to help the Republican nominee win. The attempt was unsuccessful.

In 2011, Callahan unsuccessfully sought a school board seat in Eugene. His then-wife, Sherry, also unsuccessfully ran for a different seat on the board in the same election.

In 2012, Callahan ran for President of the United States as a Republican. He filed to run in both the New Hampshire and Arizona primaries.

Later in 2012, Callahan won the Republican nomination without opposition for the same Oregon House of Representatives seat he had sought in 2010, losing again to Nancy Nathanson in the general election.

In 2014, Callahan sought the Republican nomination for the U.S. Senate, receiving nearly 7% of the vote and coming in third place, behind Jason Conger and eventual nominee Monica Wehby. During this campaign, Callahan was featured on Fox News after an argument with Nigel Jaquiss, a reporter, resulted in him being kicked out of a Willamette Week editorial interview.

In 2015, Callahan unsuccessfully sought a seat on the Mt. Hood Community College Board of Directors.

In 2016, Callahan received the Republican nomination for the U.S. Senate, winning the primary with 38% of the vote. He won the primary over businessman Sam Carpenter, Lane County Commissioner Faye Stewart, and business consultant Dan Laschober. He lost the general election to the Democratic nominee, incumbent U.S. Senator Ron Wyden.

In 2017, Callahan unsuccessfully sought to become chair of the Oregon Republican Party.

Callahan ran for Oregon's 5th congressional district in 2018. He won the Republican nomination in May 2018, but was defeated by Democrat Kurt Schrader in the November general election.

Callahan relocated to Montgomery, TX and ran in the GOP primary in May 2022 for GOP Precinct Chair, Precinct No. 11.  Callahan garnered just above 10% of the vote and lost to the GOP nominee Marliese' Stripling, receiving just above 70% of total votes.

Political positions 
Callahan stated he is "focusing on the pressing issues and problems that are facing Oregonians right now, and am committed to finding and pursuing real solutions for our state." During the 2016 United States presidential election, he volunteered for the campaign of Ted Cruz.

Callahan supports implementing a flat tax. He also supports implementing term limits for members of Congress, and is opposed to illegal immigration. Callahan is opposed to both the North American Free Trade Agreement and the Trans-Pacific Partnership. When asked about climate change in a 2014 interview, he said, "it's a myth".

Campaign financing 
In January 2017, The Register Guard reported that Callahan received Supplemental Nutrition Assistance Program (SNAP) benefits - also known as "food stamps" - shortly after funding his 2014 U.S. Senate campaign. Callahan "poured $9,090 of his own money into his candidacy and loaned his campaign another $6,500, according to federal campaign finance records" making him the top contributor to his campaign. Callahan reportedly admitted to receiving food stamps stating, "The amount of SNAP benefits I received after the primary election was very meager in comparison to others." Callahan has reportedly not held a full-time job since 2014.

In a 2014 court filing, Callahan wrote that he was claiming unemployment benefits as well. According to The Register Guard, "Callahan requested to go part time at his network administrator job at a Portland technology company 'to allow time for me to be active in my campaign for the U.S. Senate.'" Callahan further claimed that he was laid off from his network administrator job on March 21, 2014, because his employer needed a full-time person. In 2016 while running for U.S. Senate and volunteering in Oregon for Senator Ted Cruz's presidential campaign, Callahan contributed $2,700 directly and loaned his personal campaign $6,100. He later repaid himself $4,100 of that loan.

Personal life 
Callahan has two daughters, and divorced in 2013. His ex-wife, Sherry, supported his 2014 U.S. Senate campaign.

Electoral history

References

External links
 Campaign website

1977 births
Businesspeople from Oregon
Independent Party of Oregon politicians
Living people
Oregon Greens
Oregon Democrats
Oregon Republicans
Oregon State University alumni
Politicians from Portland, Oregon
Politicians from Salem, Oregon
Candidates in the 2012 United States presidential election
Candidates in the 2016 United States Senate elections
Candidates in the 2018 United States elections